Chrysoritis pyroeis, the sand-dune opal, is a butterfly of the family Lycaenidae. It is found in South Africa.

The wingspan is 22–31 mm for males and 25–38 mm for females. Adults are on wing from August to April with peaks from September to October and in February. There are several generations per year.

The larvae feed on Zygophyllum flexuosum and Thesium species. They are attended to by Myrmicaria nigra ants.

Subspecies
Chrysoritis pyroeis pyroeis (Western Cape, along the west coast to the Northern Cape and along the south coast to Stilbaai)
Chrysoritis pyroeis hersaleki (Dickson, 1970) (fynbos in coastal hills near Port Elizabeth in the Eastern Cape)

References

Butterflies described in 1864
Chrysoritis
Endemic butterflies of South Africa
Taxa named by Roland Trimen